Pretkalpa is a 2007 Nepali historical fiction novel by Narayan Dhakal. It was published in 2007 by Sajha Prakashan and won the Sajha Puraskar, . The novels depicts the life of people of a town in the Kanth (outskirts of Kathmandu) during the early 20th century.

Synopsis 
The novel is set in a fictional place called Dukhapur, located in the northeastern region of Kathmandu. It set during the reign of Chandra Shumsher JBR. The book shows the difficulties of common people under the autocratic Rana rule and the feudalistic society.

It is a story of family, social, cultural and political upheaval and conflict when a young man returns to the village after completing his education and trying to use his knowledge to uplift the societal norms and values. The book not only tells the story of that era but also the various evil practices and customs that exists till date. It also provides information on the ideological battle between the 'Puranavadi' and 'Vedavadi' schools of Hindu philosophy and its social impact.

Characters 

 Acharya Balkrishna, a 19-year-old guy who had returned from Benaras after studying Sanskrit. He is influenced by the progressive ideas of Dayananda Saraswati and wants to bring changes to his village.
 Acharya Ramkrishna, father of Balkrishna, a priest.
 Mannodari, Balkrishna's mother
 Jimbal Bishnubhakta, a villager and wellwisher of Balkrishna's family. Bishnubhakta also works as the informer and tax collecter of Dukhapur for Chandra Shumsher.
 Rambhakta, Bishnubhakta's son and Balkrishna's childhood friend
 Chandra Shumsher JBR, incumbent Prime minister of Nepal
 Padma Shumsher JBR
 Baber Shumsher JBR
 Kaiser Shumsher JBR
 Damyanti, a young widow who lives in the frills of Dukhapur. Also, the love interest of Balkrishna
 Subhadra, Damyanti's mother-in-law
 Hanumane (Ashwini), a Dalit Sarki boy from Naikap village. The boy is separated from his father during the coronation of King Tribhuvan and found by Bishnubhakta. The boy is raised by Balkrishna in his house and renamed as Ashwini.
 Shankhadar, the nemesis of Balkrishna's and Bishnubhakta's family.
 Chakradhar, Shankhadar's father and a jyotish
 Rajaram, Balkrishna's companion in prison.

Reception 
The book won the Sajha Puraskar in 2007. The award is presented to best book published within Sajha Publication.

See also 

 Seto Dharti
 Radha 
 Palpasa Cafe
 Karnali Blues

References 

21st-century Nepalese books
21st-century Nepalese novels
Nepalese novels
Nepalese fiction
Nepalese books
Sajha Puraskar-winning works
2007 Nepalese novels
Nepali-language novels